Murshed Al-Arashani (born 1952- ) is a Yemeni judge and politician. He served as Minister of Justice in Yemen.  In 2012, he received anonymous death threats.

Judge Al-Arashani used to be a member of the Higher Judiciary Council, and a member of the Higher Court Head of Islah Social Charity Association.

References

21st-century Yemeni politicians
Living people
Year of birth missing (living people)
Justice ministers of Yemen
Yemeni judges
1952 births
People from Sanaa Governorate